Haicheng ( unless otherwise noted) may refer to the following locations in China:

Haicheng, Liaoning, a county-level city in Liaoning
Haicheng District, a district of Beihai, Guangxi

Towns
Haicheng, Fujian (海澄镇), in Longhai, Fujian
Haicheng, Guangdong, in Haifeng County, Guangdong
Haicheng, Ningxia, in Haiyuan County, Ningxia

Townships
Haicheng Township, Guangxi, in Pingguo County, Guangxi
Haicheng Township, Heilongjiang, in Zhaodong, Heilongjiang